Cambuí may refer to:

 Cambuí Municipality, a municipality in the state of Minas Gerais, Brazil
 Cambuím (disambiguation) or Cambuí, the common name for a number of species of plant in the family Myrtaceae
 Myrciaria cuspidata
 Myrciaria delicatula
 Myrciaria plinioides
 Myrciaria tenella